Sari Qamish (also Romanized as Sārī Qamīsh; also known as Sari Ghamish, Sar Mīsh, and Sarqmesh) is a village in Sofalgaran Rural District, Lalejin District, Bahar County, Hamadan Province, Iran. At the 2006 census, its population was 166, in 40 families.

References 

Populated places in Bahar County